Antonia Malatesta of Cesena, also known as Antonia Malatesta of Rimini, was a Duchess of Milan by marriage to Giovanni Maria Visconti. She was the Regent of Milan in the interim after the death of her spouse in 1412.

She was the daughter (or possibly the niece) of Carlo I Malatesta, Lord of Cesena, Fano, Pesaro, and Rimini. To help ally himself with the House of Malatesta, Giovanni Maria Visconti, the Duke of Milan married Antonia in the city of Brescia in 1408. They had no children.

After Giovanni Maria’s assassination in 1412, the succeeding Duke of Milan, Filippo Maria Visconti, permitted Antonia to continue sharing the governance of the duchy for a few months. Although she soon retired to Cesena, she retained her title, Duchess of Milan.

In art
 Malatesta with her husband, Giovanni Maria Visconti, depicted as Mary and the child Jesus.
 A portrait of Antonia at the Certosa (a Carthusian monastery, north of Pavia) and a portrait of her husband

In literature
 Bellarion, by Raphael Sabatini

References

15th-century Italian women
15th-century women rulers
Duchesses of Milan
House of Malatesta